Terry Roy is an American politician serving as a member of the New Hampshire House of Representatives for the Rockingham 32 district. He assumed office on December 5, 2018.

Career 
Prior to entering politics, Roy served in the United States Army for six years. He was deployed to West Germany during the Cold War and later fought in the Gulf War. 

After retiring from the military, Roy worked in law enforcement and education. He was a member of the Deerfield Municipal Budget Committee and Deerfield Republican Party. Roy was elected to the New Hampshire House of Representatives in November 2018 and assumed office the following month. Roy serves as vice chair of the House Executive Departments and Administration Committee and House Criminal Justice & Public Safety Committee.

References 

Republican Party members of the New Hampshire House of Representatives
People from Deerfield, New Hampshire
People from Rockingham County, New Hampshire
1968 births
Living people